Durakhlu (also Romanized as Dūrākhlū; also known as Darākhlū) is a village in Zarrineh Rud Rural District, Bizineh Rud District, Khodabandeh County, Zanjan Province, Iran. At the 2006 census, its population was 70, in 13 families.

References 

Populated places in Khodabandeh County